Doyleville is an unincorporated community in Gunnison County, in the U.S. state of Colorado.

History
Doyleville is named after Henry Doyle who, along with his wife Susan and their children, homesteaded 160 acres along Tomichi Creek in 1876. The settlement became a stop for the Barlow and Sanderson stage, and a train station was later established with the arrival of Denver and Rio Grande Railroad in the summer of 1881. The Doyleville station allowed area ranchers to ship hay and livestock by rail to markets east over the Continental Divide. The station also became active with passengers traveling to and from nearby Waunita Hot Springs. A post office and one-room school were also opened in 1881. 

Activity in Doyleville greatly diminished when the Denver and Rio Grande Railroad discontinued passenger service in 1940 and completely abandoned the line in 1955. The school was closed in 1966 and the post office was closed in 1969.

In its early years this settlement or its train station briefly assumed various names included Doyle, Doylestown, Gilman, and Hot Springs.

See also
Shavano (train)

References

External links
Barlow & Sanderson Company – Staging in the Mountains Legends of America.
D&RGW train nearing the Doyleville station from the east. Photo by Otto Perry.

Unincorporated communities in Gunnison County, Colorado
Unincorporated communities in Colorado